Adel "Abe" White (May 16, 1904 – October 1, 1978) was a professional baseball player. He was a left-handed pitcher for one season (1937) with the St. Louis Cardinals. For his career, he compiled an 0–1 record, with a 6.75 earned run average, and 2 strikeouts in 9 innings pitched. A single in his only at-bat left White with a rare MLB career batting average of 1.000.

White's only decision came on July 18 when the Cardinals fell to the Brooklyn Dodgers, 6–5, at the Polo Grounds.

White was born in Winder, Georgia, and died in Atlanta, Georgia at the age of 74.

References

External links

1904 births
1978 deaths
Baseball players from Georgia (U.S. state)
Birmingham Barons players
Carrollton Champs players
Carrollton Frogs players
Galveston Buccaneers players
Griffin Pimientos players
Knoxville Smokies players
Lindale Pepperells players
Major League Baseball pitchers
Minor league baseball managers
Mobile Bears players
Mobile Shippers players
Monroe Twins players
New Bern Bears players
People from Winder, Georgia
Rochester Red Wings players
Sportspeople from the Atlanta metropolitan area
St. Louis Cardinals players